Just Joined is Jughead's Revenge's fifth studio album, released in 1998. This album marked the first time since 1992's It's Lonely at the Bottom that the band would record together as a five-piece, adding Craig Riker as their second guitarist. It was also their first and only album recorded with then-future Guttermouth drummer Ty Smith. The album was re-released in 2008 by Nitro Records via iTunes along with Image Is Everything and Pearly Gates.

Track listing

Personnel
 Joe Doherty − vocals
 Joey Rimicci − guitar
 Craig Riker - guitar
 Brian Preiss − bass
 Ty Smith - drums

References

1998 albums
Jughead's Revenge albums
Nitro Records albums